The Cemetery Club is a 1993 American comedy film directed by Bill Duke. The film stars Olympia Dukakis, Ellen Burstyn, Diane Ladd and Danny Aiello. Jerry Orbach and Lee Richardson appear in a brief prologue sequence.

Plot
Based on the play by Ivan Menchell, this comedy-drama concerns three friends, Doris, Lucille, and Esther. All three live in the same Jewish community in Pittsburgh, are in their mid-to-late 50s, and have become widows within the past few years. Once a week, they gather to visit their husbands' graves and meet at a deli afterward to talk about their lives.

Doris remains fiercely devoted to her late husband and takes her responsibilities as a widow seriously. Lucille is eager to get her feet back in the waters of dating, partly as revenge against her late husband, who often cheated on her, and partly because she's very lonely by herself. Esther is also not used to being alone after 39 years of marriage, but she doesn't feel ready to start dating again, at least not until she meets Ben, a former cop turned cab driver who gradually but firmly eases his way into her life.

Doris is appalled when she discovers that Esther is dating again and loudly protests that she's being disrespectful to her late husband, while Lucille is more than a bit jealous that Esther snagged a good man before she could. All of which comes to fruition at the wedding of their friend Selma.

Cast
Ellen Burstyn as Esther Moskowitz
Olympia Dukakis as Doris Silverman
Diane Ladd as Lucille Rubin
Danny Aiello as Ben Katz
Lainie Kazan as Selma
Jeff Howell as Paul
Christina Ricci as Jessica
Bernie Casey as John
Wallace Shawn as Larry
Stephen Pearlman as Rabbi
Hy Anzell as Al
Robert Costanzo as Morty
Irma St. Paule as Theresa
Bingo O'Malley as Judge
Catherine Keener as Gail Moskowitz
Jerry Orbach as Jake Rubin
Lee Richardson as Murry Moskowitz

Reception
On review aggregator website Rotten Tomatoes, the film holds an approval rating of 57% based on 7 reviews, with an average rating of 6/10.

Roger Ebert of Chicago Sun-Times said:

References

External links

1993 comedy-drama films
American comedy-drama films
Films scored by Elmer Bernstein
Films about old age
Films directed by Bill Duke
Films set in Pittsburgh
Touchstone Pictures films
Films produced by David Brown
1990s English-language films
1990s American films